is a dish that originated from northern Kyushu, Japan, made of braised chicken and vegetables. It is often eaten when bringing in the new year in Japan.

History and etymology
Chikuzen-ni was named after the historical Chikuzen Province (now Fukuoka Prefecture). The dish was originally called game-ni, perhaps a derivation from the Hakata dialectal verb "gamekurikomu", meaning "to collect" (because of how the ingredients were gathered and cooked together). An alternative theory holds that Japanese soldiers stationed in Korea during the Japanese invasions of Korea used turtles called dobugame instead of chicken, and called the dish game-ni, where game is short for dobugame.

Today, chicken is used instead of turtle meat. According to the Ministry of Public Management, Home Affairs, Posts and Telecommunications of Japan, chicken and burdock root are consumed the most in Fukuoka, Japan; believed to be due to the high number of households that make chikuzen-ni.

Preparation and serving
The ingredients are first sautéd together in oil. Bring dashi, shiitake flavored broth, and mirin (sweet rice seasoning) to a simmer and let the chicken cook in the mixture. Then, insert taro root, dried shiitake mushrooms, konnyaku (yam cake), burdock root, lotus root, and carrots, and cook until the vegetables are tender. Sometimes, snap peas are added after the vegetables are completely cooked.

External links
| ケンミンの秘密 | カミングアウトバラエティ 秘密のケンミンSHOW

Japanese chicken dishes